Trace State Park (formerly Old Natchez Trace Park) is a public recreation area located off Mississippi Highway 6, approximately  east of Pontotoc and  west of Tupelo in the U.S. state of Mississippi. The state park surrounds  Trace Lake and is named for the nearby Natchez Trace trail. Famed frontiersman Davy Crockett once lived within the area bounded by the park.

Activities and amenities
The park features boating, waterskiing and fishing, primitive and developed campsites, cabins and cottages, the Jason M. Stewart Nature Trail,  of trails for mountain biking, horseback riding and off-road vehicles, picnic area, and two 18-hole disc golf courses.

References

External links

Trace State Park Map Mississippi Department of Wildlife, Fisheries, and Parks

State parks of Mississippi
Natchez Trace
Protected areas of Pontotoc County, Mississippi